The Mark Building is a building in Portland, Oregon. It previously served as a Masonic Temple, and was acquired by the Portland Art Museum in 1992. The building was remodeled in 2005.

References

External links
 

Buildings and structures in Portland, Oregon
Former Masonic buildings in Oregon
Portland Art Museum
Southwest Portland, Oregon